The Ötztal is an alpine valley located in Tyrol, Austria. The Ötztaler Ache river flows through the valley in a northern direction. The Ötztal separates the Stubai Alps in the east from the Ötztal Alps in the west. The northern end of the valley is at the confluence of the Ötztaler Ache and Inn rivers, 8 km east of Imst and 50 km west of Innsbruck. The only railway station of the valley, Ötztal railway station, is located here and connects the Ötztal with the Arlberg railway (Innsbruck-Bludenz) and also a motorway interchange to the A12 (E60).

The southern end of the valley, also called the Gurglertal, terminates at the border with Italy. The valley is formed by the main chain of the Alps, with many glaciers and high peaks, including the Weißkugel and the Similaun. The village of Obergurgl at the southern end of the Ötztal is the highest parish in Austria.

The Ötztal consists of five municipalities (from north to south): Sautens, Oetz, Umhausen, Längenfeld, and Sölden. The main industry in the valley is tourism. The mountains around the valley are popular with both mountaineers and skiers. There are ski resorts in the upper part of the valley at Sölden, Hochsölden, and Hochgurgl. The Timmelsjoch mountain pass connects the Ötztal with the Passeier Valley and Merano in the province of South Tyrol, Italy.

The Ötztal Glacier Road is the highest paved road in the Alps. It is the access road from Sölden to the Rettenbach glacier and the Tiefenbachferner glacier. The highest point of the glacier road is at southern end of the ski tunnel.

History

The oldest tool finds in the region, evidence of human settlement are approximately thousands of years old. Most famous example is 
a well-preserved natural mummy of a man who lived around 3,300 BCE with the nickname Ötzi; he is also called the Iceman, the Similaun Man, the Man from Hauslabjoch, the Tyrolean Iceman, Homo tyrolensis, and the Hauslabjoch mummy. Ötzi was found in 1991 in the nearby Schnalstal glacier near the Fineilspitze and the Similaun. The Ötzi monument is located about an hour's walk from the Similaun Hut.

Umhausen is the oldest village in the Ötztal area.

Sölden as we know it today grew out of 20 buildings in the 13th century AD. One of these buildings, which still exists today, is the Berghof.
A building on the site of the Berghof was first mentioned in 1370. In 1588, the Berghof was mentioned in the records of St. Petersberg Castle as one of the original farmsteads.

Hedwig von Trapp / The Sound of Music
Hedwig von Trapp, a member of the Trapp family, lived and worked after the dissolution of the family choir in Farst, above Umhausen. This workplace, located at 1470 meter above sea level was designed to alleviate the asthma-related Hedwig von Trapp. Hedwig von Trapp was known from the film and musical The Sound of Music, in this film the experiences of the Trapp family have been filmed. Hedwig von Trapp was portrayed by the character "Brigitta" in the film. The school, Hedwig von Trapp worked, is still in its original condition.

Gallery

See also
 List of highest paved roads in Europe
 List of mountain passes

Valleys of Tyrol (state)